Carl Rafn may refer to:

 Carl Christian Rafn (1795–1864), Danish historian, translator, and antiquarian
 Carl Gottlob Rafn (1769–1808), Danish scientist and civil servant